François Périer (born François Pillu; 10 November 1919 – 29 June 2002), was a French actor renowned for his expressiveness and diversity of roles.

He made over 110 film and TV appearances between 1938 and 1996, with notable excursion into the French avant-garde. He was also prominent in the theatre. Among his best-known parts was that of Hugo in the first production of Jean-Paul Sartre's Les Mains Sales in 1948. He was the narrator of the French-language version of Fantasia, and made several commercial audio recordings (with commentary) popularizing classical music in France. In 1957 he won the BAFTA Award for Best Actor for his performance in the film Gervaise.

Life 

Périer was born in Paris, France, on 10 November 1919. He had two daughters with his first wife, Jacqueline Porel: photographer Jean-Marie and journalist Anne-Marie. He died on 29 June 2002 in Paris of a heart attack during his sleep.

His remains were interred at Passy Cemetery in Paris next to those of the stage and silent film actress Réjane (1856–1920), who was the grandmother of Périer's first wife.

Filmography

1938: Mother Love (directed by Jean Boyer) - Batilly
1938: Hôtel du Nord (directed by Marcel Carné) - Adrien
1939: La Fin du jour (directed by Julien Duvivier) - Le journaliste
1939: The Fatted Calf (directed by Serge de Poligny) - Gaston Vachon
1939: Nightclub Hostess (directed by Albert Valentin) - Jean
1941: Le Duel (directed by Pierre Fresnay) - Jean
1941: First Ball (directed by Christian-Jaque) - Ernest Vilar
1941: Happy Days (directed by Jean de Marguenat) - Bernard
1942: Mariage d'amour (directed by Henri Decoin) - Pierre
1942: Lettres d'amour (directed by Claude Autant-Lara) - François de Portal
1943: The White Truck (directed by Léo Joannon) - François Ledru - un jeune garagiste
1943: La Ferme aux loups (directed by Richard Pottier) - Bastien
1944: Bonsoir mesdames, bonsoir messieurs (directed by Roland Tual) - Dominique Verdelet
1944: L'Enfant de l'amour (directed by Jean Stelli) - Maurice Orland
1946: Sylvie and the Ghost (directed by Claude Autant-Lara) - Ramure
1946: La Tentation de Barbizon (directed by Jean Stelli) - Le diable et Ben Atkinson / The Devil
1946: Au petit bonheur (directed by Marcel L'Herbier) - Denis Carignol
1946: Un revenant (directed by Christian-Jaque) - François Nisard
1947: Le Silence est d'or (directed by René Clair) - Jacques Francet
1948: Une jeune fille savait (directed by Maurice Lehmann) - 'Coco' Levaison
1948: La Vie en rose (directed by Jean Faurez) - François Lecoc
1948: Woman Without a Past (directed by Gilles Grangier) - Michel
1949: Jean de la Lune (directed by Marcel Achard) - Clotaire dit Cloclo - le frère fantasque et envahissant de Marceline
1949: Retour à la vie (directed by Georges Lampin) - Antoine (segment 2 : "Le retour d'Antoine")
1950: La Souricière (directed by Henri Calef) - Michel Riverain
1950: Orphée (directed by Jean Cocteau) - Heurtebise
1950: Au p'tit zouave (directed by Gilles Grangier) - M. Denis
1950: Old Boys of Saint-Loup (directed by Georges Lampin) - Charles Merlin
1950: Souvenirs perdus (directed by Christian-Jaque) - Jean-Pierre Delagrange (episode "Une couronne mortuaire")
1951: L'Affaire Manet (directed by Jean Aurel) (court-métrage) (voice)
1951: Sous le ciel de Paris (directed by Julien Duvivier) - Récitant (voice)
1951: My Seal and Them (directed by Pierre Billon) - François Verville
1952: L'Amour, Madame (directed by Gilles Grangier) - François Célerier
1952: She and Me (directed by Guy Lefranc) - Jean Montaigu
1953: Un trésor de femme (directed by Jean Stelli) - François Delaroche
1953: Jeunes mariés (directed by Gilles Grangier) - Jacques Delaroche
1953: Capitaine Pantoufle (directed by Guy Lefranc) - Emmanuel Bonavent
1953:  (directed by Jean Image) - Narrator (voice)
1953: Les Amants de la villa Borghese (Villa Borghese) (directed by Vittorio De Sica and Gianni Franciolini) - Il professore di greco (segment: Pi-greco)
1954: Quelques pas dans la vie (Tempi nostri) (directed by Alessandro Blasetti and Paul Paviot) - Lui
1954: Secrets d'alcôve (directed by Jean Delannoy) - Bertrand Germain-Latour (segment "Lit de la Pompadour, Le")
1954: Scènes de ménage (directed by André Berthomieu) - Trielle
1954: Cadet Rousselle (directed by André Hunebelle) - Cadet Rousselle
1955: Stopover in Orly (directed by Jean Dréville) - Pierre Brissac
1955: Le Ciel de lit (directed by Marcel L'Herbier) (TV Movie)
1955: Les Évadés (directed by Jean-Paul Le Chanois) - François
1956: The Man Who Never Was (L'Homme qui n'a jamais existé) (directed by Ronald Neame) - Clerk of British Embassy (uncredited)
1956: Gervaise (directed by René Clément) - Henri Coupeau - le second compagnon de Gervaise, un ouvrier zingueur
1956: I'll Get Back to Kandara (directed by Victor Vicas) - André Barret
1957: Que les hommes sont bêtes (directed by Roger Richebé) - Roland Devert
1957: Les Louves (directed by Luis Saslavsky) - Gervais Larauch / Bernard Pradal
1957: Nights of Cabiria (Le Notti di Cabiria) (directed by Federico Fellini) - Oscar D'Onofrio
1957: Anyone Can Kill Me (directed by Henri Decoin) - Paul - le directeur de la prison
1957: Charming Boys (directed by Henri Decoin) - Robert
1958: La Création du monde (directed by Eduard Hofman) - Récitant / Narrator (voice)
1958: La Bigorne (directed by Robert Darène) - La Bigorne
1958: Maxime (directed by Henri Verneuil) - Récitant / Narrator (voice, uncredited)
1958: L'Américain se détend (directed by François Reichenbach) (court-métrage) - Récitant (voice)
1959:  (directed by Étienne Périer) - Tony Varlet / Bobosse / Les six jurés / Le président du Tribunal / L'avocat général / L'avocat / Le garde
1959: Les Affreux (directed by Marc Allégret) - (voice)
1959: Il Magistrato (directed by Luigi Zampa) - Luigi Bonelli
1960: Le Testament d'Orphée (directed by Jean Cocteau) - Heurtebise (uncredited)
1960: Lovers on a Tightrope (directed by Jean-Charles Dudrumet) - Daniel
1960: La Française et l'amour (directed by Christian-Jaque) - Michel (segment "Divorce, Le")
1960: Jack of Spades (directed by Yves Allégret)
1960: Zaa, petit chameau blanc (directed by Jacques Poitrenaud) (court-métrage) - (voice)
1961: Les Amours de Paris (directed by Jacques Poitrenaud) - Maurice Lasnier
1961: L'Amant de cinq jours (directed by Philippe de Broca) - Georges
1961: Réveille-toi chérie (directed by ) - Robert
1962: Girl on the Road (directed by Jacqueline Audry) - L'homme de 40 ans
1962: Le Crime ne paie pas (directed by Gérard Oury) - Récitant / Narrator (voice)
1962: Mandrin (directed by Jean-Paul Le Chanois) - Narrator (voice, uncredited)
1963: The Bamboo Stroke (directed by Jean Boyer) - Léon Brissac
1963: Les Veinards (directed by Jean Girault) - Jérôme Boisselier (segment "Le manteau de vison")
1963: Dragées au poivre (directed by Jacques Baratier) - Legrand (le nounou 1)
1963: Les Camarades (I Compagni) (directed by Mario Monicelli) - Maestro Di Meo
1963: La Visita (directed by Antonio Pietrangeli) - Adolfo Di Palma
1964: Week-end à Zuydcoote (directed by Henri Verneuil) - Alexandre
1967: Un homme de trop (directed by Costa-Gavras) - Moujon
1967: Le Samouraï (directed by Jean-Pierre Melville) - Le Commissaire
1969: Z (directed by Costa-Gavras) - Le procureur
1968: Les Gauloises bleues (directed by Michel Cournot) - Le juge
1970: Les Caprices de Marie (directed by Philippe de Broca) - Jean-Jules de Lépine
1970: Le Cercle rouge (directed by Jean-Pierre Melville) - Santi
1970: Tumuc Humac (directed by Jean-Marie Périer) - Le juge
1971: Max et les ferrailleurs (directed by Claude Sautet) - Rosinsky
1971: Juste avant la nuit (directed by Claude Chabrol) - François Tellier
1972: La Nuit Bulgare (directed by Michel Mitrani) - Lafond
1972: L'Attentat (directed by Yves Boisset) - Le commissaire René Rouannat - un flic honnête
1973: Témoignages (directed by Jean-Marie Périer) (TV Series) - Lui
1973: Nous voulons les colonels (directed by Mario Monicelli) - Onorevole Luigi Di Cori
1974: Antoine and Sebastian (directed by Jean-Marie Périer) - Antoine
1974: Stavisky... (directed by Alain Resnais) - Albert Borelli
1975: Sara (directed by Marcel Bluwal) (TV Movie) - Restif de la Bretonne
1975: Docteur Françoise Gailland (directed by Jean-Louis Bertucelli) - Gérard Gailland
1976: Police Python 357 (directed by Alain Corneau) - Commissaire Ganay
1977: Baxter, Vera Baxter (directed by Marguerite Duras) - Jean Baxter (voice)
1978: La Raison d'état (directed by André Cayatte) - le professeur Marrot
1978: Mazarin (directed by Pierre Cardinal) (TV Mini-Series) - Mazarin
1979: The Police War (directed by Robin Davis) - Colombani
1980: Le Bar du téléphone (directed by Claude Barrois) - Commissaire Claude Joinville
1983: Le Battant (directed by Robin Davis and Alain Delon) - Gino Ruggieri
1983: Thérèse Humbert (directed by Marcel Bluwal) (TV Movie) - Me Dumort
1984: La piovra (directed by Damiano Damiani (TV Mini-Series) - Avvocato Terrasini
1984: Le Tartuffe (directed by Gérard Depardieu) - Orgon
1984: Jacques le fataliste et son maître (directed by Claude Santelli) (TV Movie) - Denis Diderot
1985: La piovra,  (directed by Florestano Vancini) (TV Mini-Series) - Avvocato Terrasini
1987: La piovra,  (directed by Luigi Perelli) (TV Mini-Series) - Avvocato Terrasini
1987: Soigne ta droite (directed by Jean-Luc Godard) - L'homme
1990-1991:  (directed by Jean Delannoy) (TV Series) - Berthomieu / Berthomieu, dit 'Le vieux' / Le Vieux
1990: Lacenaire (directed by Francis Girod) - Le père de Lacenaire
1991: Madame Bovary (directed by Claude Chabrol) - Récitant / Narrator (voice)
1991: La Pagaille (directed by Pascal Thomas) - Gabriel
1992: Voyage à Rome (directed by Michel Lengliney) - Le père
1996: Mémoires d'un jeune con (directed by Patrick Aurignac) - Le père de Frédéric (final film role)

References

External links
 

1919 births
2002 deaths
Burials at Passy Cemetery
Male actors from Paris
French male film actors
20th-century French male actors
Best Foreign Actor BAFTA Award winners
Commandeurs of the Ordre des Arts et des Lettres